2010 Rio de Janeiro floods may refer to:

January 2010 Rio de Janeiro floods and mudslides, an extreme weather event in the State of Rio de Janeiro in January 2010.
April 2010 Rio de Janeiro floods and mudslides, an extreme weather event in the State of Rio de Janeiro in April 2010.